Ti Lawka Sanda Thonlula  was the chief queen consort of King Uzana of Pagan. Chronicles say that she was succeeded as chief queen by Saw Hla Wun but inscriptional evidence indicates that it was Yadanabon who succeeded.

Notes

References

Bibliography
 
 
 

Chief queens consort of Pagan
13th-century Burmese women